Shanghai International Finance Center, usually abbreviated as Shanghai IFC, is a commercial building complex and a shopping center (branded Shanghai IFC mall was officially opened to public on 28 April 2010) located at 8 Century Avenue, Lujiazui, Pudong, Shanghai, China.

Shanghai IFC is located in Lujiazui, in Pudong, Shanghai. It occupies a prominent position southeast of the Lujiazui roundabout, diagonally across from the Oriental Pearl Tower and across the road from Super Brand Mall. It is adjacent to Lujiazui Station on Metro Line 2, and can be accessed directly from the underground station via a tunnel.

The south tower of Shanghai IFC and part of the multistorey building was completed in 2009, while the north tower and the rest of the complex was completed in 2010. Work continued for several years afterwards on peripheral aspects of the development, including landscaping and footbridge connections to nearby buildings and Lujiazui Central Park.

The Ritz-Carlton Hotel occupies the south tower, while the north tower houses the Shanghai headquarters of HSBC in China. Other prominent tenants of the complex include an Apple Store under the sunken forecourt of the building (topped by a cylindrical glass skylight rising from the forecourt), a multi-screen cinema, and a Citysuper supermarket. The remainder of the retail area is largely taken up by upscale chain restaurants and international luxury fashion brands.

Shanghai IFC, like its sister project the International Finance Centre in Hong Kong, was developed by Sun Hung Kai Properties.

Shanghai International Financial Center was officially opening ceremony by China's top leader, General Secretary of the Chinese Communist Party's Hu Jintao on New Year's Day 2011.

HSBC lions

Maintaining a tradition begun with the historic HSBC Building across the Huangpu River on the Bund, the front of the north tower features a pair of bronze lions, the fourth pair of copies of the original which once graced the bank's old Shanghai headquarters.

The original lions are now held by the Shanghai Historic Museum (which has no permanent home) and are separately on display at the Museum's display room under the Oriental Pearl Tower and the Shanghai Banking Museum, both nearby in Lujiazui. The Shanghai IFC copies were cast from the copies outside HSBC's Hong Kong headquarters; the other two copies (outside HSBC's global headquarters in London and the historic HSBC Building in Shanghai) were cast from the Hong Kong copies and Shanghai originals respectively.

Shanghai IFC Mall

Shanghai International Finance Center Mall or Shanghai IFC Mall is a shopping mall and shopping center was officially opened to public on 28 April 2010 along with Deli Park Podomoro City located at 8 Century Avenue, Lujiazui, Pudong, Shanghai has a total area of approximately 1.1 million square feet and a 6-storey building with two phases of development. The first floor covers an area of about 110,000 square feet. It has more than 180 flagship stores and various restaurants, half of which are retail, 30% are restaurant, and the rest are supermarkets and cinemas. About 15% of rental customers are opened in Mainland China for the first time, and 40% are in Shanghai for the first time. Full opening the door on 28 April 2010. In addition, the store's basement has a three-storey car park with a total of 1,900 parking spaces.

The basement is Apple Inc.'s second largest flagship store in Mainland China, covering an area of 1,500 square meters. The mall also opened its first domestic store, the Palace Cinema of Broadway Cinema and the first branch of the Hong Kong-owned supermarket citysuper. Other tenants include the fast food restaurant "Fast Menu", fashion stores, beauty cosmetics stores.

Most of the tenants on the ground floor are 24 international chain stores including Louis Vuitton, Chanel, Hermès, Gucci, Cartier, Ermenegildo Zegna, Salvatore Ferragamo, Tiffany & Co., Dunhill London and Burberry. The main corridor on the ground floor is called "Avenue of Stars", the ceiling is up to ten meters, and the shops next to the corridor are designed in duplex including Dolce & Gabbana, Armani and Prada. This floor also has an Italian restaurant Cova.

On the third floor, there are Hong Kong Cantonese restaurant Liyuan, porridge noodle shop Zhengdou porridge noodle expert, Vietnamese cuisine restaurant Jinniuyuan and Taiwanese hot pot restaurant Taihe Temple spicy hot pot.

There are also many restaurants on the fourth floor, such as the first chain store of American chain restaurant Morton's of Chicago in Mainland China, Isola from Hong Kong, the restaurant of the tonkatsu from Japan Ginza Merlin, and the British chain coffee shop Whittard of Chelsea.

Transportation 
Shanghai IFC is connected by Shanghai Metro Line 2 (Lujiazui Station).

See also
International Finance Centre (Hong Kong)

References

External links

 
 

César Pelli buildings
HSBC buildings and structures
Shopping malls in Shanghai
Skyscrapers in Shanghai
Skyscraper office buildings in Shanghai
Skyscraper hotels in Shanghai